Guy Mettan is a Swiss journalist and politician. He was a member of the Christian Democratic People's Party of Switzerland before becoming a member of the Swiss People's Party.

In 2001 he was appointed Vice-President of the Swiss-West African Chamber of Commerce. Mettan has been president of the Swiss-Russian Chamber of Commerce since its inception in 2005. From 2006 to 2014 he was President of the Geneva Section of the Red Cross Switzerland. He also served as President of the Grand Council of Geneva and sat for the center there until 2019.

Mettan was awarded the Russian medal of the Order of Friendship in February 2017 by President Vladimir Putin. While parliamentary regulations prohibit elected officials from receiving decorations from foreign governments, the Grand Council of Geneva authorised him to receive the medal on a 36-35 vote.

Mettan's journalistic credibility has been questioned on several occasions. In 2017, Reporters Without Borders criticised Mettan for his pro-Russian militancy and for serving as a mouthpiece for Russian propaganda. Florian Irminger, Secretary General of the Swiss Green Party, also called Mettan an apologist for Putin's government. Following Mettan's support for the Ukraine bioweapons conspiracy theory in a Die Weltwoche essay in 2022, Swiss magazine Republik referred to the article as a "breathtaking compendium" of Russian propaganda.

Personal life
Mettan is married. In 1994, the family adopted a 3-year-old Russian girl, Oxana, from an orphanage in Suzdal. Later, Russian citizenship was granted to Mettan by the Yeltsin administration.

Books
2004: Genève, ville de paix: de la Conférence de 1954 sur l'Indochine à la coopération internationale
2010: Guy Mettan, Christophe Büchi, Le dictionnaire impertinent de la Suisse
2014: Guy Mettan, François Bugnion, Jean-François Pitteloud, Serge Nessi, Philippe Bender, Serge Bimpag, 150 ans de passion humanitaire, la Croix-Rouge genevoise de 1864 à 2014, Genève, Slatkine, 
2017: Creating Russophobia: From the Great Religious Schism to Anti-Putin Hysteria
2016: (Italian language edition) Russofobia. Mille anni di diffidenza

References

Year of birth missing (living people)
Living people
Swiss journalists
Swiss politicians
Naturalised citizens of Russia
Christian Democratic People's Party of Switzerland politicians
Recipients of Russian civil awards and decorations